Community Consolidated School District 158  is a school district in Illinois.  The district serves some nearly 9,500 students living in Huntley as well as western portions of Lake in the Hills and Algonquin and surrounding areas.  The district employs over 1,400 staff members.  The school district, which is one of the fastest growing in the state of Illinois, has grappled with skyrocketing enrollment and the subsequent problems associated with it for nearly a decade.  The school district has transformed itself from a one elementary/one high school district as recently as 1996 to a district that as of 2006 boasts 5 elementary schools, 2 middle schools, and 1 high school on three campuses district-wide.

Innovations
The school district is famous for some of its innovations, including the campus-concept idea in which each campus has 2 elementary schools, a junior high, and a high school.  Contrary to the traditional neighborhood school, this idea means that a student will usually spend their whole K-12 education on one campus and will usually have to ride the bus to school, rather than walk.  The district's three campuses are each about a square quarter mile.
The district also employed a block schedule for a number of years in the late 1990s and early 2000s for its high school students, in which students would attend four 85 minute classes one day, also known as red days, and then four different classes the next day known as white days, and then back to the red day schedule the following day and so forth.
Additionally, the district has become a model for other districts for its focus and emphasis on technology in education.  The district invests highly in the latest computers, software, televisions, projection equipment, digital cameras, and so forth.
The district has very good programs in arts and music, thanks in part to the Fine Arts Boosters organization.
All buildings now in use by the school district were built between 1997 and 2005.  It is very rare for a district of this size and rapid growth rate to have all new buildings.
In 2012, Consolidated School District 158 implemented the "1 to 1" program, backed by Curriculum Loft.  The program began at Martin Elementary, giving KUNO tablets to the students 3–5.  In 2013, the "1 to 1" program expanded to include all the elementary schools in the district, assigning tablets to each student K-5.  In 2014, the "1 to 1" program grew again to give middle schoolers, 6–7, Chromebooks to use in school. 
In 2016, All students were given Chromebooks, getting upgrades and new chromebooks either when they break, or if they are advancing to the 1st, 3rd, 6th or 9th grades.

Controversy/Incidents
The school district has encountered plenty of controversies and incidents in recent years, including:
The changing of the high school's mascot from "Redskins" to "Red Raiders" in 2002 due to suing threats from the Native American Bar Association.  This resulted in some backlash from longtime residents of the community.
The school district has also come under fire for its recent building referendums as well as a 2005 tax-increase request.  All the district referendums have eventually been approved, but it has almost always taken at least two tries with voters.  Some argue the district employed scare tactics about program cuts if the tax increase referendum failed, and argued the district was not handling money properly.  The resignation of the Superintendent and CFO of the district in 2005 added to the speculation of problems within the district.
Additionally, the presence of nearly 10,000 new residents from the retirement community Del Webb's Sun City Huntley has given the district a new challenge, as this neighborhood has a history of largely turning down any kind of referendum, meaning that unity on the part of parents and other area residents is crucial to winning referendums.
The school district no longer uses its two original school buildings located in Huntley.  They sold the former high school building to the Huntley Park District for use as a recreation center, and sold the former elementary school building and athletic fields to a commercial developer who recently bulldozed everything on the property in early 2006.  The district has come under criticism for failure to continue to make adequate use of these buildings or for not getting its money's worth on the deal.
On March 24, 2006, Board member Larry Snow ordered that distribution of the March issue of Huntley High School's student newspaper The Voice be halted due to an editorial critical of his activity criticizing a neighboring school district's referendum.  Board President Michael Skala called an emergency meeting for Monday, March 27, 2006, to resolve the issue and decide whether or not the paper should be distributed.  Likely due to public outcry over Snow's censorship of the paper and fearing lawsuits, the School District voted against Snow's censorship and allowed unabridged distribution of the paper.
During Homecoming Week in 2013, the senior class planned to dress in themes different from, but corresponding with, the student-council approved and published spirit themes. The Sunday before, the student council advisor warned that dressing outside of the approved themes could result in disciplinary action. Rumors about seniors being banned from the Homecoming dance permeated the HHS Seniors Facebook page and seniors' Twitter accounts. By the end of the school day on Monday, one senior had spoken to the daily herald about the tension and Huntley's principal overruled the warning, clarifying that seniors dressing appropriately would not be disciplined.
February 2017 had a Huntley High School Student distribute highly racist pamphlets on campus grounds. The student did not face criminal charges.
In October 2017, hate crime and disorderly conduct charges were filed against a Marlowe Middle School student. Threatening and racist videos were posted on social media, but the situation was rectified without harm being done.
In May 2018, a Marlowe student sent a "troubling" message to their peers following a confrontation with staff.            
In February 2019, Conley Elementary School Had an emergency evacuation due to a pipe burst, Students reportedly walked to Mackeben Elementary, The neighboring Elementary School and spent the last 2 hours of the school day in the gymnasium of Mackeben. The pipe burst was due to a Midwest Winter, causing it to freeze, eventually bursting about 2 months after
During the 2021–2022 school year, many students at Huntley High School decided it would be funny to follow the "devious lick" trend on TikTok. They did this by stealing various items from bathrooms, as well as spreading their own poop on the walls. This led to multiple major bathrooms being closed down and an urban legend of the infamous "Wall Shitter".

Schools
Harmony Road Campus in Huntley
Huntley High School (grades 9–12)
Leggee Elementary School (grades K-5)

Reed Road Campus in Lake in the Hills
Henry Marlowe Middle School (grades 6–8)
Henry Marlowe Middle School was opened in 2005. Its school mascot is the Mustang, and the school colors are black, white, and silver.
Hannah Martin Elementary School (grades 3–5)
May Chesak Elementary School (grades K-2)

Square Barn Road Campus in Algonquin
District 158 Administration/Transportation Building
Bernice Heineman Middle School (grades 6–8)
Bernice Heineman Middle School was opened in 2005 after Huntley Middle School closed. Its mascot is the Hawk, and the school colors are silver and blue.
Marion Conley Elementary School (grades 3–5)
The school mascot is a coyote.
Mackeben Elementary School (grades K-2)

See also
Fox Valley Conference
List of school districts in Illinois
Huntley, Illinois
Algonquin, Illinois
Lake in the Hills, Illinois

References

External links
Consolidated School District 158 Old Website 
District 158

Algonquin, Illinois
School districts in Kane County, Illinois
School districts in McHenry County, Illinois